The Integrated Soldier System Project (ISSP) is Canada's program to equip dismounted soldiers with state-of-the-art equipment, using a combination of commercial, off-the-shelf technologies (COTS) and current-issue military gear. The equipment is designed to improve command execution, target acquisition and situational awareness by:
 Providing communications, command and control at the soldier level
 Integrating small arms with high-tech equipment
 Promoting a view of the individual soldier as a system rather than as a segment of a larger force
 Providing different variants for low level commanders, assaulters and supporters

Use by soldiers:
 this vest is currently used by troops in Canada and on deployment (such as Latvia)
 soldiers using the ISS vest of preference to the old "fishing" vest.
 the electronic portions of the vest are largely not used by soldiers as it makes the vest much less practical while increasing weight and electronic signature. 
 many soldiers who are not permitted to use non-issued chest rigs like the vest but it is still 20 years out of date as a vest. (The carrier itself not the electronic parts.) As such they still ask desperately to be able to spend their own money on equipment that is modern.

Background
Canada's desire for a Soldier System dates back to November 1988 and closely follows efforts in many NATO countries.  The first research effort, called Integrated Protective Clothing and Equipment (IPCE), was initiated in 1995, but then was cancelled due to its high cost and its failure to meet the majority of requirements. Ongoing operations in the mid 1990s led to the creation of the Clothe the Soldier (CTS) Project, which directly addressed the NATO Soldier System Capability areas of Survivability and Sustainability. The Canadian Disruptive Pattern was implemented during the Clothe Soldier Project (CTS).

Integrated Soldier System Project
The Integrated Soldier System Project (ISSP) is intended to provide an integrated suite of equipment that may include weapons and electronic devices. The $310 million project program will provide the Canadian Army with new equipment, not only to allow troops to track each other as they move throughout the battlefield, but to feed communication and targeting information to their Battle Management Command, Control, Communications, Computers and Intelligence (BMC4I) systems. The project is expected to unfold over the next ten years. The Department of National Defence confirmed that approximately 17,000 integrated soldier systems would be bought by 2011. The ISSP will address the remaining NATO Soldier System capabilities of Lethality, Mobility and Survivability, while balancing the baseline needs.

Small Arms Replacement Project
In October 2007, the Department of National Defence approved the Small Arms Replacement Project II (SARP II), which will deliver integrated, direct fire, multi-effect, portable anti-personnel and anti-material capability through weapons, munitions, fire control systems, training systems and logistic support. The cost for SARP II exceeds $1 Billion for the 2012-2022 period.

References

Proposed military equipment
Future soldier programs
Canadian Army